Daniel Rees may refer to:
Daniel Rees (priest) (1793–1857), Welsh clergyman and hymnwriter
Daniel Rees (economist), American economist
Daniel Rees (politician) (1866–1934), Australian politician
Dan Rees (rugby) (1876–?), Welsh rugby union and rugby league footballer
Dan Rees (artist) (born 1982), Welsh artist